Isaac Rand Jackson (January 13, 1806 – July 27, 1842) was an American diplomat and collector.

Early life
Jackson was born in 1804. He was a son of Hannah ( Parsons) Jackson (b. 1783) and Abraham Jackson (1748–1823) of Newburyport, a Loyalist during the Revolution who was an officer of Excise under King George III. Among his siblings was Ellen Jackson, who married George F. Pearson, Rear Admiral of the U.S. Navy who commanded the Pacific Squadron during the later part of the American Civil War.

His maternal grandparents were Capt. Jonathan Parsons and Hannah ( Giles) Parsons. After the death of Capt. Parsons, his grandmother married Stephen Cross, Esq.

Career
Jackson was described as: "A man of brilliant parts, and of great promise; of highly cultivated mind, of refined taste, and remarkable for a pleasing and easy address, and graceful manners"

He practiced law in Philadelphia and collected "minerals, coins, statuary" and "his natural taste for these pursuits was cultivated and strengthened by a residence of two years in Europe, and a pedestrian tour of Switzerland." Jackson was appointed U.S. Chargé d'Affaires to Denmark on May 20, 1841, by President William Henry Harrison, who was his personal friend. He presented his credentials on October 12, 1841.

Personal life
In 1833, Jackson was married to Louisa Catherine Carroll (1809–1869), the youngest daughter of Charles Carroll of Homewood (son of Charles Carroll of Carrollton, a signer of the Declaration of Independence) and Harriet ( Chew) Carroll (daughter of Benjamin Chew, Chief Justice of Pennsylvania). Together, they were the parents of:

 Louisa Carroll Jackson, who died young.
 Harriet Carroll Jackson (1835–1877), who married Leonard Douglas Hay Currie of the British Army in 1862.
 Charles Carroll Jackson (1836–1900), a merchant who married Minnie Coster and, after her death, Mary Van Nest, daughter of Abraham Van Nest, in 1882; he died of peritonitis aboard the S.S. Columbia.
 Oswald Chew Jackson (1838–1891), a merchant who married Ella Moore Willing, a daughter of Caroline Willing and Dr. Edward Peace of Philadelphia; he drowned at sea.
 Mary Ellen Jackson (1841–1909), who married Capt. Nalbro Frazier, son of Nalbo Frazier and uncle to Charles W. Ogden, in 1867.

Jackson died at his post in Copenhagen on July 27, 1842, after an illness of three weeks. His body was returned to America and he was buried at Laurel Hill Cemetery in Philadelphia.

References

External links
Isaac Rand Jackson (?–1842) at the United States Department of State

1806 births
1842 deaths
Ambassadors of the United States to Denmark
19th-century American diplomats